The 2016–17 SMU Mustangs women's basketball team represented Southern Methodist University in the 2016–17 NCAA Division I women's basketball season. The Mustangs, led by first year head coach Travis Mays, played their home games at Moody Coliseum and were fourth year members of the American Athletic Conference. They finished the season 19–15, 7–9 in AAC play to finish in a three way tie for fifth place. They advanced to the quarterfinals of the American Athletic women's tournament where they lost to South Florida. They received a bid to the Women's National Invitational Tournament where they defeated Louisiana Tech and Abilene Christian in the first and second rounds before losing to Indiana in the third round.

Media
All Pony Express games will air on KAAM. Before conference season home games will be streamed on Pony Up TV. Conference home games will rotate between ESPN3, AAC Digital, and Pony Up TV. Road games will typically be streamed on the opponents website, though conference road games could also appear on ESPN3 or AAC Digital.

Roster

Schedule and results

|-
!colspan=12 style=""| Non-conference regular season

|-
!colspan=12 style=""| AAC regular season

|-
!colspan=12 style=""| American Athletic Conference Women's Tournament

|-
!colspan=12 style=""| WNIT

See also
2016–17 SMU Mustangs men's basketball team

References

External links
SMU Mustangs women's basketball official website 

SMU Mustangs women's basketball seasons
SMU
2017 Women's National Invitation Tournament participants